

Gmina Kłobuck is an urban-rural gmina (administrative district) in Kłobuck County, Silesian Voivodeship, in southern Poland.

Villages
Apart from the town of Kłobuck, Gmina Kłobuck contains the villages and settlements of Biała Dolna, Biała Górna, Borowianka, Gruszewnia, Kamyk, Kopiec, Lgota, Libidza, Łobodno, Nowa Wieś and Rybno.

Neighbouring gminas
Gmina Kłobuck is bordered by the city of Częstochowa and by the gminas of Miedźno, Mykanów, Opatów and Wręczyca Wielka.

Twin towns – sister cities

Gmina Kłobuck is twinned with:
 Štúrovo, Slovakia

References

Klobuck
Kłobuck County